Stanze may refer to:

Raphael Rooms
Stanze (album)
Italian singular of stanza